SS Beatus was a British cargo steamship that was built in 1925, sailed in a number of transatlantic convoys in 1940 and was sunk by a U-boat that October.

Building
Ropner Shipbuilding & Repairing Co Ltd of Stockton-on-Tees, England built Beatus, completing her in February 1925. The boilers fed a three-cylinder triple expansion steam engine that was rated at 436 NHP and drove a single screw. The engine was built by Blair and Company, also of Stockton.

Beatus was registered in Cardiff, managed by W.H. Seager & Co Ltd and owned by another of William Seager's companies, Tempus Shipping Co, Ltd.

Second World War career
By early 1940 Beatus was sailing in convoys. In February 1940 she joined Convoy SL 20 from Freetown, Sierra Leone to Liverpool with a cargo of wheat. In May and June 1940 she brought a general cargo across the North Atlantic to the UK via Bermuda, where she joined Convoy BHX 46. and Halifax, Nova Scotia, where BHX 46 joined Convoy HX 46. In late July Beatus was carrying a cargo of steel and pit props when she joined another HX convoy, HX 60, from Halifax, NS to Liverpool. Between ocean voyages, Beatus sailed in a number of North Sea coastal convoys.

Convoy SC 7 and sinking
Early in October Beatus left Trois-Rivières, Quebec, carrying a cargo of 1,626 tons of steel, 5,874 tons of timber and a deck cargo of crated aircraft bound for Middlesbrough via the Tyne. She went via Sydney, Nova Scotia, where she joined Convoy SC 7 bound for Liverpool. SC 7 left Sydney on 5 October. At first the convoy had only one escort ship, the  sloop . A wolfpack of U-boats found the convoy on 16 October and quickly overwhelmed it, sinking many ships over the next few days.

Endrass fired four torpedoes: one hit and sank the Swedish freighter ; another hit Beatus. Frank Holding, Assistant Steward on Beatus, recalled:"The next thing I heard was this explosion and a sound like breaking glass from down near the engine room. The ship stood still. When I went to the boat deck one of the lifeboats was already in the water, full of water... We knew we were sinking."

References

 

1925 ships
Maritime incidents in October 1940
Ships sunk by German submarines in World War II
Ships sunk with no fatalities
Ships built on the River Tees
Steamships of the United Kingdom
World War II merchant ships of the United Kingdom
World War II shipwrecks in the Atlantic Ocean